The 1985 Indian Federation Cup was the 9th season of the football competition.  The competition was won by East Bengal, who defeated local rivals Mohun Bagan 1–0 at Bangalore.

Group stage

Group A

Group B

Group C

Group D

Semi-finals

Final

References
 1985 Federation Cup

Indian Federation Cup seasons
1985–86 domestic association football cups
1985–86 in Indian football